Dancemania 9 is the ninth set in the Dancemania series of dance music compilation albums, released in 1998 by EMI Music Japan.

The album debuted at #12 on Oricon's weekly album chart in May 1998 and remained within the top 20 positions on the chart for 4 consecutive weeks, peaking at #10.

The non-stop mixing was done by the Swedish DJ also credited as Disco Dude on the album, JJ.


Tracks

Further details

The album's overall average tempo is 136 bpm;
The lowest bpm is 115 (#5).
The highest bpm is 160 (#2-4).
The album contains 3 covers or remixes.
#8 "Let's Get Down" is a remix / cover of Kool & the Gang's "Celebration".
#10 "I Feel Love" is a cover of Donna Summer's "I Feel Love".
#13 "You Make Me Feel Brand New" is a cover of The Stylistics' "You Make Me Feel Brand New".
Several tracks on the album, including different remixes, can also be found on other Dancemania albums such as 5, Extra, Happy Paradise 2, Speed 8, Delux 3, Best Yellow, Scorccio Super Hit Mix, Disco Groove, Bass #5 or Winters.

References

9
1998 compilation albums
Dance music compilation albums